César Augusto Charún Pastor (born 25 October 1970, in Lima) is a former Peruvian footballer who played as a center back.

Club career
Charún played for a number of clubs in Peru, including Universitario and Cienciano. He also had a spell with Paniliakos in the Greek Super League during the 1997–98 and 1998–99 seasons.

International career
Charún made twelve appearances for the senior Peru national football team, including playing in a qualifying match for the 1994 FIFA World Cup.

Honours

Club
Universitario de Deportes:
Peruvian First Division (2): 1992, 1993

References

External links

1970 births
Living people
Footballers from Lima
Association football central defenders
Peruvian footballers
Peru international footballers
Club Universitario de Deportes footballers
Club Alianza Lima footballers
Coronel Bolognesi footballers
Deportivo Municipal footballers
Deportivo Sipesa footballers
Paniliakos F.C. players
Sporting Cristal footballers
Estudiantes de Medicina footballers
Cienciano footballers
FBC Melgar footballers
C.D. Chalatenango footballers
Unión Huaral footballers
Atlético Minero footballers
Atlético Torino footballers
Copa Perú players
Peruvian Primera División players
Peruvian Segunda División players
Super League Greece players
Peruvian expatriate footballers
Expatriate footballers in Greece
Peruvian expatriate sportspeople in Greece
Expatriate footballers in El Salvador
1993 Copa América players